With a Song in My Heart is a 2008 album by jazz singer and swing jazz guitarist John Pizzarelli, celebrating the music of Richard Rodgers.

Track listing
"With a Song in My Heart"3:49
"This Can't Be Love"2:27
"I Like to Recognize the Tune"4:36
"It's Easy To Remember"4:13
"Johnny One Note"2:59
"Nobody's Heart"4:12
"Happy Talk"4:25
"Mountain Greenery"2:47
"I Have Dreamed"3:40
"The Lady Is a Tramp"2:34
"She Was Too Good to Me"4:36
"You've Got to Be Carefully Taught"2:59

All music composed by Richard Rodgers, with all lyrics by Lorenz Hart, except "Happy Talk", "I Have Dreamed" and "You've Got to Be Carefully Taught", lyrics by Oscar Hammerstein II.

Personnel
John Pizzarelliguitar, vocals
Larry Fullerpiano
Martin Pizzarellibass
Tony Tedescodrums
John Moscatrombone, baritone horn
Andy Fuscoalto saxophone, tenor saxophone, bass clarinet
Kenny Bergerbaritone saxophone, bass clarinet
Tony Kadlechtrumpet, flugelhorn

Special guests
Bucky Pizzarelliguitar (track 4)
Cesar Camargo Marianopiano (track 7)
Don SebeskySwing Seven Arrangements

References

2008 albums
John Pizzarelli albums
Vocal jazz albums
Telarc Records albums